Paolo Fossati (1938 in Arezzo – 26 October 1998 in Turin) was an Italian author, professor and art historian.

Born in Arezzo from Teresa Negro and Pietro Fossati, he moved with the family to Turin where he finished his high school. He started studying law and ended getting a degree in Romance philological studies and literature at the university of Turin with Prof. Avalle.

He started working as the art critic for the Italian newspaper "L'Unità" in 1965, married Eva Menzio, the daughter of painter Francesco Menzio and had his first son Filippo. One year later, right after the birth of his daughter Caterina, he started working for the publisher Giulio Einaudi as senior editor where he worked until he died. During his years at Einaudi publisher, he collaborated with many important intellectuals such as Primo Levi, Natalia Ginzburg, Italo Calvino, Leonardo Sciascia, Ernst Gombrich, Federico Zeri, Cesare Brandi among many others.

In 1972 he wrote the first survey on Italian Design in a book titled "Il design in Italia 1945-1972" published by Giulio EInaudi in Turin. He becomes closer to a generation of Italian architects and designers such as Achille Castiglioni, Bruno Munari, Marco Zanuso, Roberto Sambonet, Alessandro Mendini, Ettore Sottsass and many others.

He was the creator and curator (with Giulio Bollati) of the encyclopedic enterprise of the Storia dell'arte italiana (History of Italian Art). Was also the creator and curator of the series of books Einaudi Letteratura, which included personalities such as Ugo Mulas, Samuel Beckett, Walter Benjamin, George Bataille, Alberto Savinio, Claude Simon, Carlo Emilio Gadda, Man Ray, Fausto Melotti, Francesco Lo Savio, Giulio Paolini, Bruno Munari, Giuseppe Penone, Lucio Fontana, Luigi Veronesi, Alberto Burri, Luciano Fabro among others. He wrote essays and catalogues collaborating with artists and architects such as Giorgio Morandi, Alighiero Boetti, Mario Merz, Carol Rama, Pirro Cuniberti, Alberto Burri, Bruno Martinazzi, Piero Manai, Marco Gastini, Vittorio Gregotti, Achille Castiglioni, Michelangelo Pistoletto, Renzo Piano, Ettore Sottsass, among many others.

He taught Social History of Art and Art Criticism at the Universities of Bologna, Pisa, Venice and Turin and wrote extensively all his life.
He died in Turin on 26 October 1998.

Selected bibliography

External links

References 

1938 births
1998 deaths
Italian art historians
Italian art critics
People from Arezzo
20th-century Italian historians